The South European nase (Protochondrostoma genei) is a species of cyprinid fish.

It is found in Italy and Slovenia. Its natural habitats are rivers and freshwater lakes. It is threatened by habitat loss.  It is the only species in its genus.

References

 Crivelli, A.J. 2005.  Chondrostoma genei.   2006 IUCN Red List of Threatened Species.   Downloaded on 19 July 2007.

Leuciscinae
Fauna of Italy
Fauna of Slovenia
Cyprinid fish of Europe

Fish described in 1839
Taxa named by Charles Lucien Bonaparte
Taxonomy articles created by Polbot